The Mercedes Simplex 60 hp was an automobile manufactured by Daimler Motoren Gesellschaft in 1903 and 1904. Its predecessor was the Mercedes 35hp which had been the fastest production car in the world. Unlike the 35 hp though, this wasn't a racing car and became Mercedes' top of the range model. The car came with two or four passenger bodywork and only four still exist today.

History 
On 11/12 July 1904 Harry Harkness set the first record for the Mount Washington Hillclimb Auto Race with a 24:37.6sec.

See also 

 Timeline of most powerful production cars

Daimler Motoren Gesellschaft
60hp
Cars introduced in 1903
1900s cars
Veteran vehicles